The Naga Regiment is an infantry regiment of the Indian Army. It is among the youngest regiments of the Indian Army - the first battalion was raised in Ranikhet,  Kumaon in 1970. The regiment recruits mainly from Nagaland, in northeast India.

History

Formation

The first battalion of the regiment (1 Naga) was raised at the Kumaon Regimental Centre, Ranikhet on 1 November 1970 under the command of Lt. Col. R.N. Mahajan, VSM. Being the only battalion, it was then designated as the Naga Regiment. The manpower to raise this battalion was provided by battalions of the Kumaon Regiment, Garhwal Rifles and 3 Gorkha Rifles. 69 Nagas were enrolled directly from rehabilitation camps of underground Nagas. However, the regiment's troops were to be 50% Nagas and 50% of an equal number of Kumaonis, Garhwalis and Gorkhas. Since many Kumaon battalions had been associated with Nagaland, particularly in the years preceding the raising of the Naga Regiment, it was affiliated to the Kumaon Regiment for all regimental matters. The second battalion (2 Naga) was raised on 11 February 1985 at Haldwani and the third battalion (3 Naga) was raised on 01 October 2009 at Haldwani.

The traditional Naga weapons viz the Dao, the Spear and the prestigious Mithun have been integrated into the Regimental Crest. The regiment's colours are gold, green and red - the gold signifies the rising sun, the green signifies the infantry and red is the colour of authority among Nagas. 1 Naga was presented with 'Colours' on 6 May 1978 at Dehradun by Shri Neelam Sanjiva Reddy, the President of India and 2 Naga was presented with 'Colours' on 10 May 1990 by General V.N. Sharma, PVSM, ADC, the Chief of Army Staff.

Operation Romeo
The 2nd battalion of the regiment (2 Naga) was inducted into Keran sector of Kupwara district, Jammu and Kashmir, where it was responsible for ensuring the sanctity of approximately 24 kilometres of Line of Control (LoC) and also to counter anti-national elements and their operations. It was in this sector that 2 Naga participated in one of the landmark operations - Operation Romeo. The goal of this operation was to dominate the LoC. The entire operation was carried out with clockwork precision and without any casualties to Indian troops.

Indo-Pakistani War of 1971

The 1st battalion (1 Naga) took part in operations in East Pakistan and earned a name for the regiment. It was awarded one Vir Chakra and three Sena Medals.

UN Mission
2 Naga has been deployed on the UN mission in Sudan and was awarded with UN Force Commander's Appreciation Card.

Kargil War
2 Naga was deployed as part of Operation Vijay in order to push back Pakistani infiltrators who had crossed the LoC in Kargil, Jammu and Kashmir. It was one of the first units to be inducted into the theatre of conflict. An assault group from 2 Naga attacked and destroyed a heavily guarded Pakistani mortar position and ammunition dump on Twin Bump in the Point 4875 complex, an action for which Sep. Imliakum Ao was awarded the Maha Vir Chakra. 2 Naga also took part in the assault on Tiger Hill, where it attacked the mountain from its left flank.

Issues
Although two battalions of the Naga Regiment were raised as per the historic 16-point 1960 agreement that facilitated the formation of Nagaland state, as of 2001 there were complaints that there was no proper representation of Naga youths in the regiment, headquartered at Ranikhet in Uttarakhand. Nagaland comes under dispensation category and the education standard required for soldier general duty (GD) category is only class-V standard for tribal candidates.

The Army then conducted a special recruitment drive for all category of posts to recruit 325 Naga youths across the state. GOC Nagaland, Major General R. N. Kapur, said at least 3,000 Naga youths would be recruited in the Army, Assam Rifles and reserve battalions in 2014 and hoped the youth would avail the opportunity to join the armed forces.

ZAPAD 2021
Third Battalion The Naga Regiment represented India and Indian military in the Multilateral Joint Strategic Exercise ZAPAD 2021 which was held at Russia.

Units
1st Battalion
2nd Battalion
3rd Battalion
164 Infantry Battalion (TA) (Jakhama, Nagaland)

Decorations
1 Maha Vir Chakra
8 Vir Chakras
1 Kirti Chakra (Major David Manlun), posthumous.
6 Shaurya Chakras
1 Yudh Seva Medal
1 Vishist Seva Medal
48 Sena Medals

References 

 Naga Regiment on Bharat-Rakshak

Infantry regiments of the Indian Army from 1947
Military units and formations established in 1970